When Was That? is an album by Henry Threadgill released on the About Time label in 1982.  The album and features five of Threadgill's compositions performed by Threadgill with Craig Harris, Olu Dara, Fred Hopkins, Brian Smith, Pheeroan akLaff and John Betsch.

Reception
The Allmusic review by Thom Jurek states, "Threadgill's main thrust was to create a series of modal environments whereby all instrumentalists would engage with one another in the framework of a particular tune, yet play different roles as the ensemble went on its way through the record... Ultimately, however, this band swung together, no matter how far out the proceedings got. They always returned to Threadgill's magically inherent lyricism and humor in the end, and each and every track here bears that out. This is a nearly mystical album in the life of this band".

Track listing
All compositions by Henry Threadgill
 "Melin" - 3:40  
 "10 to 1" - 11:29  
 "Just B" - 4:25  
 "When Was That?" - 10:22  
 "Soft Suicide at the Baths" - 11:07  
Recorded at Sound Ideas, New York City on September 30 and October 1, 1981

Personnel
Henry Threadgill - alto saxophone, tenor saxophone, clarinet, flute, bass flute
Craig Harris - trombone
Olu Dara - cornet
Brian Smith - piccolo bass
Fred Hopkins - bass
John Betsch - drums
Pheeroan akLaff - drums

References

1981 albums
Henry Threadgill albums